Steel Valley can refer to:

Northern Steel Valley (Ohio-Pennsylvania), the area around Youngstown, Ohio stretching from metro Pittsburgh to metro Cleveland
Southern Steel Valley (Pittsburgh), area around Pittsburgh, Pennsylvania, with it primarily describing the Monongahela Valley and Upper Ohio Valley steeltowns
Steel Valley School District
Vale do Aço, the 'Steel Valley' metropolitan area in Minas Gerais, Brazil
The valley around Stocksbridge, South Yorkshire, due to its long history of steel production